Adimari is a surname. Notable people with the surname include:

Alemanno Adimari (1362–1422), Italian Roman Catholic cardinal and archbishop
Alessandro Adimari (1579–1649), Italian poet and classical scholar
Ralph Adimari (1902–1970), American editor, researcher, and historian of the dime novel